Co-Motion Cycles is an American bicycle manufacturer located in Eugene, Oregon.  The company was formed in 1988.  It is owned by Dwan Shepard and Dan Vrijmoet.  The company makes high-end tandem and single bicycles.  Co-Motion offers both custom frames and ready-made frames in standard dimensions.  The frames in the company's current line-up are TIG-welded steel or aluminum. Their bikes cater to cyclo-cross racing, touring, road racing, and off-road touring.

See also
 List of companies based in Oregon

References

External links 
 Co-Motion Cycles (official website)
 Co-Motion builder's profile

Companies based in Eugene, Oregon
Cycling in Oregon
Cycle manufacturers of the United States
Vehicle manufacturing companies established in 1988
1988 establishments in Oregon